Brent Vieselmeyer (born September 29, 1975) is an American football defensive backs coach for the Washington Commanders of the National Football League (NFL). Vieselmeyer played college football for the University of Redlands and Concordia University Wisconsin.

Coaching career

Oakland Raiders
In March 2017, Vieselmeyer was hired as the safeties coach of the Oakland Raiders under head coach Jack Del Rio. Following Del Rio being fired at the end of the 2017 season, he was not retained by new head coach Jon Gruden.

Washington Football Team / Commanders
In January 2020, Vieselmeyer was hired as the new assistant defensive backs and nickel coach for the Washington Football Team, then known as the Redskins. This reunited him with Jack Del Rio, who was hired as the new defensive coordinator under head coach Ron Rivera.

In February 2023, Vieselmeyer was promoted to the defensive backs coach replacing Chris Harris, who left for a position on the Tennessee Titans' coaching staff.

References

External links
Washington Commanders bio

1975 births
Living people
Concordia Falcons football players
High school football coaches in California
High school football coaches in Colorado
Houston Christian Huskies football coaches
Kansas Jayhawks football coaches
Oakland Raiders coaches
Redlands Bulldogs football players
Washington Commanders coaches
Washington Football Team coaches